Luarsab (died 1652) was a member of the Bagrationi dynasty of Kartli, a great-grandson of King Luarsab I and relative of the childless King Rostom, who adopted him and made him heir apparent in 1639. Luarsab also married Rostom's niece by whom he had a son. Luarsab was killed while on a hunt. A homicide was immediately suspected. The suspect was tried by single combat and wounded, but acquitted by virtue of being a victor in the duel.

Family background 
Luarsab was a son of Prince Teimuraz-Mirza of Kartli ( 1600) and his wife, an anonymous daughter of Prince David Bagration-Davitishvili. He had a brother, Vakhtang (Rostom-Mirza; died 1655). He was a scion of all three royal branches of the Bagrationi dynasty; through his father, Luarsab was a great-grandson of King Luarsab I of Kartli and, through his mother, he descended from the Kakhetian and Imeretian royal families. The 18th-century Georgian chronicler Prince Vakhushti erroneously identifies Luarsab as "son of Vakhtang, son of King Simon", who was Luarsab I's son. This genealogy has been accepted by some modern scholars such as Cyril Toumanoff.

Biography 
Luarsab was Muslim, living in Isfahan, the capital of the Iranian Safavids. In 1639, he was adopted and designated as heir apparent to the throne of Kartli by his father’s first cousin, the seasoned king Rostom, who had no children of his own. With the shah's approval, Luarsab was brought in Kartli, but the local nobility resented yet another Persian-educated Bagratid. Luarsab was mortally wounded by a bullet while on a hunt in the Karaia grove and died in the presence of the mourning Rostom. The prince's remains were interred at Ardabil.

Prince Luarsab was married to Tamar, daughter of Prince Adam-Sultan Andronikashvili, member of the shah's elite ghulam guard, by an anonymous princess, half-sister of King Rostom. Although Prince Vakhushti claims that with Luarsab's death "the line of the great king Luarsab became extinct", the prince had a son, Giorgi (fl. 1652) and a grandson, Khosro (fl. 1700).

Aftermath 
Rostom suspected his heir's death was not an accident and requested an inquiry from Isfahan, but nothing came of this as the shah's government was preoccupied with the war in Kandahar. In the meantime, Prince Shiosh Baratashvili denounced Prince Baindur Tumanishvili as a possible murderer and had him publicly tried by single combat in Tbilisi. Tumanishvili was wounded, but won the duel and was thus acquitted. Baratashvili, also wounded and defeated, was cast in prison by Rostom, but was later pardoned and, the 18th-century Georgian Paris Chronicle says, Prince Luarsab "remained unavenged".

After the loss of his heir, Rostom intended to adopt the late Prince Luarsab's brother Vakhtang and, to the chagrin of many Georgians, give him Luarsab's widow in marriage. Vakhtang, serving to the shah as a prefect of Qazvin and having the example of his brother before him, was reluctant. Arriving in Isfahan in 1655, Rostom's envoy, Bakhuta, Prince of Mukhrani, found Prince Vakhtang already dead of illness. Within three years, the Prince of Mukhrani would become Rostom's new choice as heir apparent and would succeed him on the throne of Kartli as Vakhtang V.

Ancestry

References 

1652 deaths
Bagrationi dynasty of the Kingdom of Kartli
Georgian princes
Hunting accident deaths
Heirs apparent who never acceded
17th-century people from Georgia (country)
Year of birth unknown
Shia Muslims from Georgia (country)
Trials by combat
17th-century people of Safavid Iran
Burials in Iran
Deaths by firearm in Georgia (country)
Accidental deaths in Georgia (country)
Firearm accident victims